Ardozyga pelogenes is a species of moth in the family Gelechiidae. It was described by Edward Meyrick in 1906. It is found in Australia, where it has been recorded from Victoria and Queensland.

The forewings are pale-fuscous finely irrorated with dark-fuscous and with dark-fuscous markings, often indistinct. There is a discal dot at one-fourth, a second beyond it on the fold, a third in the disc beyond the middle, and a fourth immediately beneath and beyond the third, sometimes confluent with it. There is also a submarginal series of dots around the apex and termen. The hindwings are pale-grey.

References

Ardozyga
Moths described in 1906
Moths of Australia